Carey Nelson (born June 4, 1963 in Saskatoon, Saskatchewan) is a former long-distance runner from Canada, who represented his native country at the 1996 Summer Olympics in Atlanta, Georgia. There the resident of Vancouver, British Columbia finished the men's marathon in 35th place (2:19:39).

Achievements

References
 Canadian Olympic Committee

1963 births
Living people
Canadian male long-distance runners
Athletes from Saskatoon
Athletes (track and field) at the 1987 Pan American Games
Athletes (track and field) at the 1988 Summer Olympics
Athletes (track and field) at the 1990 Commonwealth Games
Athletes (track and field) at the 1994 Commonwealth Games
Athletes (track and field) at the 1996 Summer Olympics
Olympic track and field athletes of Canada
Pan American Games track and field athletes for Canada
Commonwealth Games competitors for Canada
Universiade medalists in athletics (track and field)
Universiade silver medalists for Canada